Hạ Long is the capital city and first-class provincial city of Quảng Ninh province, Vietnam. The name Hạ Long means "descending dragon". The city was founded in 1993, when the old capital, Hòn Gai, was merged with Bãi Cháy – the main tourist area. The city's population in 2013 was 227,000.

Overview 
The city's economy has recently switched from coal mining to tourism, due to the large number of visitors drawn by the Hạ Long Islets every year. At present, Hạ Long is enjoying rapid growth not only in tourism sphere, but as a destination upon the main pathway to southern China. In 2007 Vietnam-China Business Forum, a $400 million deal was signed to build a highway linking Hạ Long, Móng Cái and Quảng Ninh.

Hạ Long city is divided into two parts. The eastern part, Hòn Gai, where most of the official buildings and industrial infrastructure are concentrated, is connected by bridge with the western part, Bãi Cháy, known as an area for tourism.

Location 
Being a coastal city, Hạ Long bears unique potentials of tourism and seaport due to its land lies along the shore of Hạ Long Bay by 50 km. Hạ Long is 160 km to the north-east from Ha Noi, 60 km to the east from Hai Phong, 180 km to the south-west from Móng Cái international border gate, and bounded by the Gulf of Tonkin to the south. Hạ Long has strategic location of economic development, security of the region and the country.

History  
Humankind has been present on Hạ Long Bay for a long time. Over the years, archaeologists, researchers concluded that over the course of history, there were three cultures known as Soi Nhu, Hạ Long and Cai Beo culture. It shows that the bay and its surrounding areas were one of the cradles of mankind.
The heartland of today's Hạ Long City is formerly just a fishing village, called the Oyster Coast. By the beginning of the Nguyễn dynasty, it was renamed to Mau Le. The current city was then part of Hoành Bồ District.

In 1883, during the French occupation era, the French carried out coal mining in the mines on the Gulf Coast. As on many islands there were lots of hemp so the French called them Ile des brouilles or a name translated from Hon Gai to Hon Gay, later renamed Hon Gai. According to the researchers, "Hon Gai" is a deviation from the place of the French Red Sea at that time. The "H" in French is a silent sound. During this period, Hon Gai was an administrative unit of Quảng Yên Province.

After the August Revolution in 1945, this township became the capital town of the huge Hong Gai mine area. Late in 1946, the French reconquested Hon Gai. After the Geneva Conference (1954), Hong Gai town became the capital of the Hong Quang special district. On October 30, 1963, the Vietnamese government combined Hai Ninh province and Hong Quang special district to create Quảng Ninh Province, Hong Gai became the capital of Quảng Ninh, and the province's boundaries were expanded. The Hong Gai town center provided coal for all industrial zones of North Vietnam. It also was the gateway to China so it was one of the main target of the U.S. during the Vietnam War. The Bãi Cháy Ferry (decommissioned in 2007, replaced with the Bãi Cháy Bridge) was the most important transportation hub, was the target of many American bombardments, and was awarded Hero of the People's Armed Forces 3 times.

On December 27, 1993, the government issued Decree No. 102/CP. Hong Gai town officially gained its city status and was renamed to Hạ Long.

On December 17, 2019, the city's committee announced its intention to incorporate the district of Hoành Bồ into its territories.

Climate

Culture and society 
In the south of the city there is the Bài Thơ (‘Poem’) Mountain with its almost vertical seaward face, which was widely used by some historically famous local poets. The limestone peak is rich in bio-diversity and offers attractive views of the bay. There are also places of interest such as Cửa Vận Fishing Village, Hoàng Gia Park, Hạ Long Market, Bãi Cháy Trading Center, Quảng Ninh Museum, Vietnam-Japan Cultural House, Children's Cultural House.

The city has an active Catholic church in its eastern part, Hòn Gai, on the hill near the main post office, which hosts masses every Sunday evening and on Christian holidays.

Administrative divisions
The city is subdivided to 33 commune-level subdivisions, including 21 wards and 12 rural communes:

Economy 
The city comprises five economic areas:
 Area 1: Trading, services including the wards of Yết Kiêu, Trần Hưng Đạo, Hồng Gai, Bạch Đằng, Hồng Hải, Hồng Hà, Cao Xanh and Cao Thắng.
 Area 2: Industry, forestry including the wards of Hà Trung, Hà Tu, Hà Khánh, Hà Lầm and Hà Phong.
 Area 3: Industry, seaports including north-west of Bãi Cháy, north of Việt Hưng, Giếng Đáy and Hà Khẩu.
 Area 4: Tourism, trading including south of Bãi Cháy, Hùng Thắng and Tuần Châu.
 Area 5: Agriculture, fishery including Việt Hưng and Đại Yên.

The structure of Hạ Long's economy includes: Industry-tourism, services, trading, agriculture, forestry and fishery. In 2002, city's GDP increased up to VND 1,6669.7 billion (pricing of 1994), accounting for 38% of the whole province, of which industry and construction occupy 31%, tourism and services occupy 53%; revenue collection accounts for 86.3% of the province. Annual GDP growth rate is 11.4%. GDP per capital reached US$1,070 in 2002, higher than per capita income of the country in that time.

Hạ Long City has 1,470 industry and handicrafts manufacturing units, including coal mining and processing, ship building, building materials, mechanic, wood processing, food, foodstuff and garment. There are 3 industrial zones: Cái Lân (with Cái Lân Port, one of the biggest ports in North Vietnam), Đồng Đăng and Hà Khánh.

Transportation
The Van Don International Airport serves Hạ Long and the wider Quảng Ninh province. It is located approximately 50 km (31 mi) east of Hạ Long.

Gallery

References

External links 

 
 
Official website of the provincial government (Vietnamese)

1993 establishments in Vietnam
Populated places established in 1993
Provincial capitals in Vietnam
Populated places in Quảng Ninh province
Districts of Quảng Ninh province
Cities in Vietnam